Michael Booth is an Australian marathon runner from Launceston, Tasmania. Booth has presently completed 97 marathons towards his goal of 100.

Personal life
Booth is a retired accountant, and has a wife, four children, and grandchildren.

Marathons
Booth began running in 2002 at the age of 48, after a run with his brother David Booth "up and down" Cormiston Road in Launceston, Tasmania. In 2003, he began running four days a week and recording his runs. He completed his first marathon in Hobart in 2003, and since then has undertaken marathons in each Australian state and territory and on each continent. Of marathon running, Booth says that "it's a lifestyle" and "it's getting out in nature, it's running around the country roads".

In 2019, Booth completed his 40,075th kilometre—the length of the equator—during the Hobart Marathon, his 83rd marathon, with the 2810 total runs in the sixteen years to 13 January 2019.

Notable marathons completed by Booth include:

 Africa (Durban, 2007)
 North America (Boston Marathon, 2009)
 Europe (Athens, 2010)
 Asia (Great Wall Marathon, 2011)
 South America (Rio de Janeiro, 2012)
 Antarctica (King George Island, 2014)
 Six Foot Track Marathon (Blue Mountains, NSW)
 Sydney Marathon (NSW)
 Sunshine Coast Marathon (Qld)
 Gold Coast Marathon (Qld)
 Great Ocean Road (Vic)
 Melbourne Marathon (Vic)
 Alice Springs Marathon (NT)
 Adelaide Marathon (SA)
 Perth Marathon (SA)
 Convicts and Wrenches Marathon (Tas)
 Cradle Mountain Run (Tas)
 Bruny Island Ultra Race (Tas)—of which he was the winner in 2003 
 Cadbury Marathon (Tas)

Booth also competed in the 2003 Australian Three Peaks Race onboard Underwater Video Systems
as a runner with his long-time running partner David MacFarlane.
They won the fully crewed division and were Kings of the Mountain.

Michael Booth was the first Tasmanian and eighth Australian to run a marathon on all seven continents.

References

Australian male marathon runners
21st-century Australian people
20th-century Australian people
Living people
Year of birth missing (living people)